Local 217, Hotel & Restaurant Employees Union v MHM Inc, 976 F.2d 805 (1992) is a US labor law case, concerning the scope of labor rights in the United States.

Facts
Staff at the former Summit Hotel in Hartford, Connecticut, claimed they were entitled to warning before the hotel closed in 1990, and continued medical benefits. The employees were represented by, Local 217, Hotel & Restaurant Employees Union, and the claim was brought against two potential bodies. The Colonial Constitution East Limited Partnership owned the hotel. MHM, Inc. was a separate hotel management firm which operated it. Under the Worker Adjustment and Retraining Notification Act 1988 §2102(a) it was asked whether a subsidiary or parent corporation was responsible to notify employees that the hotel would close.

Judgment
The Second Circuit held the subsidiary was the employer, although the trial court had found the parent responsible, while noting the subsidiary would be the employer under the National Labor Relations Act 1935. The Court, however, refused an injunction to allow continuing health care cover for 57 days. Winter J gave the following opinion.

See also

United States labor law

Notes

References

United States labor case law